Ship of Dreams may refer to:
"Ship of Dreams", a song by Nazareth from their 1980 album Malice in Wonderland
"Ship of Dreams", a song by Hawkwind from their 1990 album Space Bandits
Ship of Dreams (album)'', a 2004 album by David Knopfler

See also
"The Ship of Dreams", referencing  in the 1997 eponymous film Titanic